The Standard Oil Service Station (also known as the Daniel's Standard Oil Service Station) is an historic service station site in Plant City, Florida, United States. It is located at 1111 North Wheeler Street, on the southwest corner of Wheeler and Cherry Streets. On September 6, 1996, it was added to the U.S. National Register of Historic Places. The station currently houses a pet store and grooming business.

See also 
 Standard Oil Gasoline Station (Odell, Illinois)
 Standard Oil Gasoline Station (Plainfield, Illinois)
 Standard Oil Gasoline Station (Bowling Green, Kentucky)
 National Register of Historic Places listings in Hillsborough County, Florida

References

External links

 Hillsborough County listings at National Register of Historic Places
 Florida's Office of Cultural and Historical Programs
 Hillsborough County listings
 Standard Oil Service Station

National Register of Historic Places in Hillsborough County, Florida
Retail buildings in Florida
Standard Oil
Commercial buildings completed in 1921
Gas stations on the National Register of Historic Places in Florida
Plant City, Florida
Transportation buildings and structures in Hillsborough County, Florida
1921 establishments in Florida